Pseudochazara baldiva is a butterfly species belonging to the family Nymphalidae described by Frederic Moore in 1865. It can be found in the Himalayas, Kashmir, Tibet and India.

The wingspan is 40–55 mm. The butterflies fly from June to July.

References

External links
 Satyrinae of the Western Palearctic - Pseudochazara baldiva

Satyrini
Butterflies described in 1865
Butterflies of Asia
Taxa named by Frederic Moore